Agyneta fabra is a species of sheet weaver found in Canada and the United States. It was described by Keyserling in 1886.

References

fabra
Spiders of Canada
Spiders of the United States
Spiders described in 1886